Michaela Lanzl (born 21 February 1983) is a German retired ice hockey forward. She represented  at the Olympic women's ice hockey tournaments in 2002 and 2006 and at six IIHF Women's World Championships.

Playing career
Lanzl debuted with the German women’s national ice hockey team at the 1999 IIHF Women's World Championship. At 16 years old, she was the youngest player on the team but her skill was undeniable – she led the team in scoring with three goals and one assist in five games played.

Her national team career spanned eleven seasons, concluding after the 2009 IIHF Women's World Championship Division 1 tournament. She played a total of 144 international matches and scored 63 goals and 37 assists, making her a German record national team player (player recognized by the German Ice Hockey Federation for playing 100 or more games with the national team).

NCAA
Lanzl played with the Minnesota Duluth Bulldogs women's ice hockey program under head coach Shannon Miller during the 2005–06 and 2006–07 seasons. In her first season, she ranked third on the team for scoring and was named to the Western Collegiate Hockey Association (WCHA) All-Conference Third Team and All-Rookie Team.

Personal life 
Lanzl's younger sister, Andrea Lanzl, holds the record for most games played with the German national ice hockey team.

Career stats

Olympics

Awards and honors
2005–06 All-WCHA Third Team
2005–06 WCHA All-Rookie Team
2010 Elite Women's Hockey League (EWHL) Champion with ESC Planegg

See also 
 Germany women's national ice hockey team

References

External links
 
 
 

1983 births
German women's ice hockey forwards
Ice hockey players at the 2002 Winter Olympics
Ice hockey players at the 2006 Winter Olympics
Living people
Minnesota Duluth Bulldogs women's ice hockey players
People from Starnberg
Sportspeople from Upper Bavaria
European Women's Hockey League players